Lucenilde Pereira da Silva, known as Lúcio Bala (born January 14, 1975 in Alvorada), is a Brazilian retired defensive midfielder.

Honours
 Goiás
 Campeonato Goiano: 1996

 Flamengo
 Campeonato Carioca: 2000
 Taça Rio: 2000

 Santos
Copa Conmebol: 1998

 Fortaleza
 Campeonato Cearense: 2005

 Atlético Mineiro 
 Campeonato Mineiro: 2007

 Paysandu
 Campeonato Paraense: 2010

 Gurupi
 Campeonato Tocantinense: 2011, 2012

 Flamengo do Piauí  
 Copa Piauí: 2013

References

External links

CBF 
placar 
Guardian Stats Centre 
 

1975 births
Living people
Brazilian footballers
Brazilian expatriate footballers
Expatriate footballers in Kuwait
Brazilian expatriate sportspeople in Kuwait
Brazilian expatriate sportspeople in Mexico
Expatriate footballers in Mexico
Expatriate footballers in South Korea
Association football midfielders
Campeonato Brasileiro Série A players
Campeonato Brasileiro Série B players
Campeonato Brasileiro Série C players
K League 1 players
Campeonato Brasileiro Série D players
Goiás Esporte Clube players
CR Flamengo footballers
Santos FC players
Associação Portuguesa de Desportos players
Botafogo de Futebol e Regatas players
Guarani FC players
Ulsan Hyundai FC players
Fortaleza Esporte Clube managers
Chiapas F.C. footballers
Sport Club do Recife players
Al-Qadsiah FC players
Clube Atlético Mineiro players
Ceará Sporting Club players
Clube de Regatas Brasil players
Clube Atlético Bragantino players
Paysandu Sport Club players
Associação Atlética Caldense players
Gurupi Esporte Clube players
Grêmio Catanduvense de Futebol players
Santa Helena Esporte Clube players
Esporte Clube Flamengo players
Associação Atlética Luziânia players
Associação Atlética Alvorada players
Brazilian football managers
Qadsia SC players
Kuwait Premier League players
Brazilian expatriate sportspeople in South Korea